Natta Ivanovna Konysheva (9 June 1935 – 16 March 2022) was a Russian painter.

Biography
In 1959 Konysheva graduated from Moscow Polygraphists Institute. She has participated in the exhibitions since 1965.

From 1960 to 1970 she worked in industrial graphic design. She illustrated and designed books for the following publishing houses: Sovetsky Pisatel, Geographizdat, Altaisky publishing house.

In 1974 Konysheva joined MSKh (Moscow Painters Organization).

A member of Women Artists Association "IRIDA".

She started from participation in the apartment’s views and rare semi-permitted shows in the large scale exhibitions. She is promoting her method of art as "reportage with miracle elements".

Konysheva's personal exhibitions were held in Moscow, Russia (1974, 1987, 1988, 2005, 2008) and in France (1988, 1994).

Artist about his credo
At the opening of the art exhibition "From Repin up to the avant-garde" on 28 September 2009 in the Institute of Restoration: "Yes, I’m common as everybody, nothing special, I’m treading the ground. Workaholic. More carpenter than painter." (VESTI-MOSCOW 29.09.09 21:31).

Albums
1988 "Catalogue. Natta Konysheva. Painting." Introduction article by Meiland, Viliam Leonidovich. Moscow Association of Artists in RSFSR Publ. Изд. «Sovetsky hudozhnik», Moscow (Russia).
2006 "Time of changes. 1960-1985 Art in the USSR." Interactive program. Information Centre "Russian museum: virtual branch", Saint-Petersburg (Russia).
2007 "Natta Konysheva. Painting." Publ. "Richard Cash Publishers", Moscow (Russia).

Articles
2000 Leonid Lerner. "NATA from Kilerov Tupik"  Journal "Ogon'ek".
2001 Meiland, Viliam Leonidovich. "Natta Konysheva Span Gold." Journal "So – Obsh’eniye".
2005 Velimir Moist. "Legend in gumshoes" Web-site Gazeta.ru
2005 Igor Chuvilin. "Put down" Web-site ANO "Editors of Daily NEWSPAPER"
2008 Dmitry Shirokov. "Natta Konysheva: thirty thousand paintings and one book." Web-site Polit.ru

Works in Collections
State Russian Museum. Saint-Petersburg. Russia.
Bryansk Art Museum. Bryansk. Russia.
Contemporary Art Museum ART4.RU.Moscow. Russia.
Gregory Gallery – New York City. United States.
Kovalsky Art Gallery. Palo Alto, CA. United States.
René Guerra Collection. Paris. France.
The Kolodzei Collection of Russian and Eastern European Art, Kolodzei Art Foundation. Highland Park, NJ. United States
 VArt Collection. Moscow. Russia.

Exhibitions
........................................
1994 An exhibition together with Marc Chagall, Matisse and Katya Medvedeva in Nice. France
1995 /+ by -/ An exhibition together with Victor Krotov . Central House of Artists. Moscow. Russia
2005 Natta Konysheva World and we are in it. Central House of Artists. Moscow. Russia
2008 Natta Konysheva and Oleg Sergeev. Painting. Moscow. Moscow Commonwealth of Artists (‘MSKh’) Painters association. Exhibition Hall on 1st Tverskaya-Yamskaya, 20.Moscow. Russia

External links
Life Journal Community: All about Natta

References

1935 births
2022 deaths
Artists from Moscow
20th-century Russian painters
21st-century Russian painters
Soviet painters
Russian women painters
Russian Expressionist painters
Russian contemporary artists
20th-century Russian women artists
21st-century Russian women artists